The Hi-Revving Tongues were a New Zealand rock band from Auckland, led by vocalist/songwriter Chris Parfitt.

The group was founded in 1967 by Parfitt, Mike Balcombe, bassist John Walmsley, organist Bruce Coleman, and drummer Rob Noad. The group reached #1 for 2 weeks in 1969 with the single "Rain and Tears", a cover of a song by Aphrodite's Child. That same year, the group did a six-month residency at the Whiskey-a-Go-Go in Sydney, Australia. In 1970, the band performed at Redwood 70, the first major modern music festival held in New Zealand. This would be their final performance together, billed as the Hi-Revving Tongues. The group later performed simply as The Tongues and then as Caboose, and split up in 1972.

References

1967 establishments in New Zealand
1972 disestablishments in New Zealand
Musical groups established in 1967
Musical groups disestablished in 1972
Musical groups from Auckland